Robson Vicente Gonçalves or simply Abedi (born 14 April 1979), is a Brazilian former footballer who played as attacking midfielder.

Abedi played for Sion in the 1997–98 Nationalliga A season. 

He joined Basel's first team for their 1998–99 season under head coach Guy Mathez. After playing in one test game Abedi played his domestic league debut for the club in the away game in the Charmilles Stadium on 1 August 1998 as Basel lost 1–3 against Servette, being substituted in the 71st minute. He scored his first goal for his new team in the 84th minute of that match.

Abedi stayed with the club for this one season in which he played a total of 38 games for Basel scoring a total of 5 goals. 25 of these games were in the Nationalliga A, 1 in the Swiss Cup and 12 were friendly games. He scored 3 goals in the domestic league, the other 2 were scored during the test games.

He then moved on to play for newly promoted Yverdon in the 1999–2000 Nationalliga A season.

Abedi was signed 4-year contract with Hapoel Tel Aviv, but after only half a season was loaned to other clubs in his native Brazil.

Honours
Rio de Janeiro's Cup: 2008
 Campeonato Carioca Série B: 2015

References

External links

 netvasco.com.br 
 
 

1979 births
Living people
Footballers from Rio de Janeiro (city)
Brazilian footballers
Brazilian expatriate footballers
Brazilian expatriate sportspeople in Israel
Expatriate footballers in Israel
Brazilian expatriate sportspeople in Switzerland
Swiss Super League players
Campeonato Brasileiro Série A players
Campeonato Brasileiro Série B players
Campeonato Brasileiro Série C players
Israeli Premier League players
Campo Grande Atlético Clube players
FC Sion players
Yverdon-Sport FC players
FC Basel players
Mogi Mirim Esporte Clube players
Coritiba Foot Ball Club players
Cruzeiro Esporte Clube players
Santa Cruz Futebol Clube players
Avaí FC players
Friburguense Atlético Clube players
CR Vasco da Gama players
Hapoel Tel Aviv F.C. players
Botafogo de Futebol e Regatas players
Madureira Esporte Clube players
América Futebol Clube (RN) players
Esporte Clube Bahia players
Duque de Caxias Futebol Clube players
Goianésia Esporte Clube players
Sociedade Esportiva e Recreativa Caxias do Sul players
Associação Desportiva Cabofriense players
America Football Club (RJ) players
Association football midfielders